Since 1925, the LAU Medical Center-Rizk Hospital on Zahar Street in Beirut, Lebanon has been dedicated to fostering and advancing the health of humankind. The hospital has evolved through its history in becoming more comprehensive with its services, facilities and offerings; continuously developing with the core purpose of humanizing medicine.

History
Dr. Rizk Clinic, recently known as LAU Medical Center-Rizk Hospital,  was first established by Dr. Toufic Ibrahim Rizk (1892-1983) in 1925 as a private family-owned clinic. His dream however, was to contribute to the medical development of Lebanon by founding a modern private medical center equipped with state-of-the-art medical facilities and employing innovative surgical techniques. In 1953, his ambitions gained momentum when he selected CIET, a French-Swiss company specialized in hospital construction, to prepare the first building blueprints. His vision was finally brought to life in 1954, when the first stone of his new hospital was laid. Rizk Hospital opened its doors to the general public on February 11, 1957, through the inauguration of its 1st building (Building A). It was constructed according to European standards becoming one of the first modern hospitals in Beirut and all of Lebanon.

In 1987, despite internal tensions, violence, and the clinic's geographic location on the green-line of demarcation, a second building was constructed and became fully operational (Building B). This building addressed the increasing demands on the hospital such as the need for a larger department for medical imagery and a technico-medical division with the latest laboratory equipment. Within this period the hospital's accommodation capacity increased from 70 to 130 beds.

Ten years later, in 1997, an expansion project was implemented with the addition of two new Buildings (C) and (D); increasing the hospital's overall accommodation capacity. These newly established buildings provided a spacious environment, facilitating an effective distribution of services for several different functions and activities within the hospital. During the same year, Rizk Hospital inaugurated a 10,000 square meter underground parking garage, offering access to 350 parking spots. In 2002, a heliport built on the roof of Building D became operational.

On June 30, 2009, The Rizk Family sold the hospital to Medical Care Holding, in which the Lebanese American University (LAU) possesses controlling interests. The hospital was renamed University Medical Center – Rizk Hospital and it now serves as the primary teaching hospital for LAU's schools of Medicine, Nursing, and Pharmacy. It is now called LAU Medical Center - Rizk Hospital.

Awards, Certifications and Accreditations

ISO 9001:2008 Certification 

In 2002, as Dr. Rizk Clinic, LAU Medical Center-Rizk Hospital was the first hospital in Lebanon awarded ISO 9001:2000 certification. This achievement was testimony to the hospital's commitment and usage of an innovative management system that emphasized quality.

Since 2002, the hospital has continued on the quality path evidence by successive ISO recertification during the next two certification periods—2005 and 2008. Today, the hospital is ISO 9001:2008 certified.

Ministry of Public Health (MOPH) Accreditation 

LAU Medical Center – Rizk Hospital is accredited by the Lebanese Ministry of Public Health (MOPH). In 2002 LAU Medical Center-Rizk Hospital received its first accreditation from the Ministry of Public Health. Operating on a three-year accreditation cycle, they were re-accredited in 2005. Seeking to broaden and strengthen its accreditation standards, the MOPH, in conjunction with the French Health Authority (HAS), launched an expanded and more rigorous accreditation process in 2009 and were re-accredited in 2011. LAU Medical Center-Rizk Hospital is preparing for JCI 5th edition, 2 baseline assessments are conducted by a qualified American team in August 2011 and January 2012.

National Order of the Cedar

As Dr. Rizk Clinic, LAU Medical Center-Rizk Hospital was awarded The National Order of the Cedar.

Hospital leadership 

Sami Rizk, Chief Executive Officer

Georges Ghanem, MD, Chief Medical Officer

Michel Mawad, MD, Dean of the Gilbert and Rose-Marie Chagoury School of Medicine (LAU)

References 

Hospital buildings completed in 1957
Hospital buildings completed in 1997
Hospitals in Lebanon
Hospitals established in 1925